Potter County Courthouse may refer to:

 Potter County Courthouse (Pennsylvania), Coudersport, Pennsylvania
 Potter County Courthouse (South Dakota), Gettysburg, South Dakota
 Potter County Courthouse (Texas), Amarillo, Texas